Greenock was a burgh constituency represented in the House of Commons of the Parliament of the United Kingdom from 1832 until 1974, when it was abolished and its area was merged into the new Greenock and Port Glasgow constituency.

Boundaries 
The boundaries of the constituency, as set out in the Representation of the People (Scotland) Act 1832, were-

"From the Point, on the West of the Town, at which the Shore of the Firth of Clyde is met by the March between the Parishes of Greenock and Innerkip, up the said March to that Point thereof which is nearest to the Southern Point of the Ridge of Bow Hill; thence in a straight Line to the said Point on Bow Hill; thence in a straight Line to the Southern End of the Upper East Reservoir for supplying Greenock with Water; thence in a straight Line, in the Direction of the highest projecting Point of Knocknair Hill, to the Point near Woodhead Quarry, at which such straight Line cuts the Easternmost of the Two Rivulets which form the Lady Burn; thence down such Rivulet and the Lady Burn to the Point at which the same joins the Firth of Clyde; thence along the Shore of the Firth of Clyde to the Point first described."

1885-1918: The existing parliamentary borough, and so much of the municipal borough of Greenock as was not already included in the parliamentary borough.

Members of Parliament

Election results

Elections in the 1830s

Elections in the 1840s

Wallace resigned, causing a by-election.

Elections in the 1850s

Elections in the 1860s

Elections in the 1870s

Grieve resigned, causing a by-election.

Elections in the 1880s

Stewart's resignation caused a by-election.

Elections in the 1890s

The original count gave a majority of 44 for Bruce; after an election petition and recount, this was revised to a majority of 55 for Sutherland. See the list of election petitions for details.

Elections in the 1900s

Elections in the 1910s

General Election 1914–15:

Another General Election was required to take place before the end of 1915. The political parties had been making preparations for an election to take place and by July 1914, the following candidates had been selected; 
Liberal: Godfrey Collins
Unionist: Samuel Chapman

* Chapman was included on the final list of Coalition Coupon candidates, despite it having been agreed there would be no coupon in this constituency. Immediately after the list was published, a telegram was sent to Collins to make it clear there was no official Coalition candidate. 
** Haughey was the nominee of the Greenock and District Dockers' Union.

Elections in the 1920s

* Geddes sought the election as a Labour candidate, despite being an official Communist candidate and having no Labour endorsement.

* Geddes sought the election as a Labour candidate, despite being an official Communist candidate and having no Labour endorsement.

Elections in the 1930s

Elections in the 1940s
General Election 1939–40:

Another General Election was required to take place before the end of 1940. The political parties had been making preparations for an election to take place from 1939 and by the end of this year, the following candidates had been selected; 
Labour: Robert Gibson

Elections in the 1950s

Elections in the 1960s

Elections in the 1970s

References 

Greenock
Historic parliamentary constituencies in Scotland (Westminster)
Constituencies of the Parliament of the United Kingdom established in 1832
Constituencies of the Parliament of the United Kingdom disestablished in 1974
Politics of Inverclyde